The Rand Afrikaans University (RAU) was a prominent South African institution of higher education and research that served the greater Johannesburg area and surroundings from 1967 to 2004. It has since merged with the Technikon Witwatersrand and two campuses of Vista University to form the University of Johannesburg.

Origins
On 5 November 1968, 468 delegates at a conference unanimously accepted a motion to establish an Afrikaans University. An act of Parliament was promulgated on 4 August 1965 to establish such a university in Johannesburg. 
Rand Afrikaans University (RAU) was founded as an Afrikaans language university in 1967 with just over 700 registered students. The first campus was situated in a brewery in Braamfontein. 
The RAU was officially opened on 24 February 1968. The first chancellor of the university was Dr Nicolaas Diederichs (then Minister of Finance of South Africa) and the first rector was Prof Gerrit Viljoen.

The first women's residence was named "Amper Daar" (Almost there) and the first hostel for men "Afslaan" (Tee off), after the golf course on which it was built.

Over time the university evolved to a dual medium institution, offering nearly all degree courses in both Afrikaans and English.

Faculties
The faculties of the RAU were as follows:

Faculty of Commerce and Economics
Faculty of Law
Faculty of Science
Faculty of Engineering
Faculty of Arts
Faculty of Health Sciences
Faculty of Education and Nursing

Location
What was the main campus is now the APK Kingsway Campus Auckland Park of the University of Johannesburg (UJ) and is situated in Auckland Park, Johannesburg, South Africa. Satellite campuses in Auckland Park, Soweto and Doornfontein are now APB, DFC and SWC campuses of UJ.

Leaders
Rector of the university

Chancellor of the university

Merger
On 1 January 2005, Rand Afrikaans University, Technikon Witwatersrand and some campuses of the Vista University ceased to exist as such, when they merged to become the University of Johannesburg, as part of a broader reorganisation of South African universities. The outgoing and final vice chancellor of the university was Prof Roux Botha.

References

Afrikaner culture in Johannesburg
Universities in Gauteng
Schools in Johannesburg
Defunct universities and colleges in South Africa
Educational institutions established in 1967
Educational institutions disestablished in 2005